This is a list of districts in the Royal Borough of Kensington and Chelsea:

Brompton
Chelsea
Earl's Court
Holland Park
Ladbroke Grove
Kensington
North Kensington
Notting Hill
South Kensington
West Brompton
World's End

Lists of places in London